is a member of both the Japanese Communist Party and the Japanese House of Councillors. She was elected to her seat in the national proportional representation block in 2016. Iwabuchi is opposed to nuclear reactors in Japan, advocating for their elimination and against their reactivation.

References

1976 births
Living people
Japanese communists
Japanese Communist Party politicians